Enrico Berti (3 November 1935 – 5 January 2022) was an Italian philosopher. He was professor emeritus of philosophy at the University of Padua.

Biography
Born in Valeggio sul Mincio, Italy, Berti graduated in philosophy in 1957 at the University of Padua, and after a few years teaching at the University of Perugia he was professor in his alma mater for almost forty years. His major interest was Aristotle, to whom he dedicated many works, and of whom he made his own translation of the Metaphysics, published in 2017. 

During his life Berti has received numerous honors, including the title of Academician of Lincei and the appointment of Grand Officer of the Order of Merit of the Republic. His Storia della filosofia. Dall’antichità a oggi ("History of Philosophy. From antiquity to today") is used as the manual of philosophy in many Italian schools and universities. Berti died on 5 January 2022, at the age of 86.

Publications 
 L'interpretazione neoumanistica della filosofia presocratica, Padova, 1959.
 La filosofia del primo Aristotele, Padova, Cedam, 1962; 2ª ed., Milano, Vita e Pensiero, 1997.
 Il "De republica" di Cicerone e il pensiero politico classico, Padova, Cedam, 1963.
 L'unità del sapere in Aristotele, Padova, Cedam, 1965.
 La contraddizione, 1967.
 Studi sulla struttura logica del discorso scientifico, 1968.
 Studi aristotelici, L'Aquila, Japadre, 1975 (nuova edizione, 2012).
 Aristotele. Dalla dialettica alla filosofia prima, Padova, Cedam, 1977.
 Ragione scientifica e ragione filosofica nel pensiero moderno, Roma, La Goliardica, 1977.
 Profilo di Aristotele, Roma, Studium, 1979.
 Il bene, Brescia, La Scuola, 1983.
 Le vie della ragione, Bologna, Il Mulino, 1987.
 Contraddizione e dialettica negli antichi e nei moderni, Palermo, L'Epos, 1987 (nuova edizione, 2015).
 Le ragioni di Aristotele, Roma-Bari, Laterza, 1989.
 Storia della filosofia. Dall'antichità a oggi (with Franco Volpi), Roma-Bari, Laterza, 1991.
 Aristotele nel Novecento, Roma-Bari, Laterza, 1992.
 Introduzione alla metafisica, Torino, UTET, 1993.
 Il pensiero politico di Aristotele, Roma-Bari, Laterza, 1997.
 (curatore, con Cristina Rossitto) Aristotele e altri autori, Divisioni, con testo greco a fronte, coll. Il pensiero occidentale, 2005.
 In principio era la meraviglia. Le grandi questioni della filosofia antica, Roma-Bari, Laterza, 2007.
 Dialectique, physique et métaphysique. Études sur Aristote, Peeters, 2008.
 Il libro primo della «Metafisica» (con Cristina Rossitto), traduzione di Antonio Russo, Roma-Bari, Laterza, 2008.
 Sumphilosophein. La vita nell'Accademia di Platone, Roma-Bari, Laterza, 2010.
 Nuovi studi aristotelici, 4 voll., Brescia, Morcelliana, 2004-2010.
 Invito alla filosofia, Brescia, La Scuola, 2011.
 La ricerca della verità in filosofia, Roma, Studium, 2014.
 Aristotelismo, Bologna, il Mulino, 2017.

References

1935 births
2022 deaths
Italian philosophers
University of Padua alumni
Academic staff of the University of Padua
Academic staff of the University of Perugia
People from the Province of Verona
Italian historians of philosophy
Historians of philosophy
Commentators on Aristotle